Steven Capriati (born August 15, 1979) is an American former professional tennis player. He is now an attorney.

Capriati, coached by his father Stefano, is a Saddlebrook graduate. He played collegiate tennis for the University of South Florida (as a freshman) and the University of Arizona. A world ranked player in singles, Capriati featured at grand slam level in mixed doubles with his elder sister Jennifer, including at the 2001 Wimbledon Championships.

References

External links
 
 

1979 births
Living people
American male tennis players
Tennis people from Florida
South Florida Bulls athletes
Arizona Wildcats men's tennis players